Ronald Woods may refer to:

Ronald Woods (rugby league), see List of Manly-Warringah Sea Eagles players
Ron Woods, retired professional baseball player

See also
Ronald Wood (disambiguation)